Simon Hansen is a South African filmmaker. Hansen has been working in the film and entertainment industry since 1992. He is best known for producing Alive in Joburg, the film on which District 9 is based.

Background
Hansen discovered and mentored long-time collaborators and friends Sharlto Copley and Neill Blomkamp. Blomkamp was still in high school when they began working together. Hansen mentored many animators and filmmakers in the South African and African Film Industries. Hansen was partnered with Copley in business for well over a decade. They supplied ETV (Emery Telcom) with a show called Deadtime which ran during the 'dead time' for midnight to 6am.

Hansen still conducts workshops in South Africa to inspire and unite young filmmakers and grow the industry. He is currently collaborating with young talent to produce films under his company Inspired Minority Pictures.

As a writer, producer and director, he has worked to build a film industry in South Africa that can compete in the international arena. Hansen owns a Visual Effects company called Atomic Visual Effects, a talent agency called 'Slaves Talent Management' and a production company called Inspired Minority Pictures, which is now his vehicle for creating, what he calls, 'commercial Independent' films.

Partnerships and associates
Simon has worked closely with Shartlo Copley, Amira Quinlan and Hannah Slezacek on most of his projects. Hansen directed and produced two viral short films, 2001: a Space Oddity and Hellweek, both of which were featured at the Cannes Film Festival in 2006 under the Cinema Du Monde Section. Hellweek also featured a then unknown Copley as a relentless US drill sergeant. The theme of Hellweek relates to the training of world-class animators in a third world South Africa. 2001: a Space Oddity shares some themes with District 9 in that it features the Space Shuttle Atlantis landing on a Cape Town street as opposed to New York or Los Angeles.

Hansen's first feature film entitled Spoon was co-directed by Copley in 2006 and shot using brand new camera technology. The supernatural thriller produced by Hansen, Quinlan and Copley stars Darren Boyd and Rutger Hauer. Copley left Hansen to finish the project, when he was offered the lead role of Wikus Van Der Merwe in District 9. Spoon was released in 2011. Hansen was instrumental in the development of the 'si2k' which was used for the first time on Spoon, and later on Slumdog Millionaire, which won an Academy Award for cinematography.

In 2005 Simon and Sharlto produced a short film directed by Neill Blomkamp entitled Alive in Joburg. The film features a documentary style account of aliens living in South African townships and is the basis for the 2009 film District 9, in which Copley starred. Hansen also directed the second unit in District 9.

In 2009 Hansen produced Pumzi, a short film which featured a future sci-fi world without water, 35 years after 'The Water War'. Pumzi (Swahili for "Breath") was written and directed by a young Kenyan director, Wanuri Kahui. The short film is part of the Focus Features backed Africa First Program and was officially in competition at Sundance 2010.

Visual Effects
Hansen's company Atomic Visual Effects has produced 3D animation and visual effects for Spoon, What the Bleep do We (k)now, The Breed, Pumzi, and Chronicle . Hansen also supervised the visual effects on Lost City Raiders, and the TV series Crusoe

Inspired Minority Pictures – Perfect 10
Inspired Minority Pictures was expected to produce 10 low-budget films and has taken over 100 submissions and conducted 4 workshops throughout South Africa. Hansen believes the process of making Spoon has shown the way for film makers to take full advantage of the new world offered through technology and innovation, and refers to Spoon as the project which proved it. He calls it "a big film in a small film's body", and is currently collaborating with young South African talent to produce 10 low-budget, high-impact, commercially independent features based on Spoon's production model. Hansen intends to use technology and innovation to turn low-budget films into more profitable commercial properties.

References

External links

Twitchfilm Simon Hansen heads to Sundance
Spoon on IMDB
Channel 24 Spoon article

Living people
South African film directors
Year of birth missing (living people)
Place of birth missing (living people)